The 2021 Acropolis Rally (also known as the EKO Acropolis Rally of Gods 2021) was a motor racing event for rally cars that held over four days between 9 and 12 September 2021. It marked the sixty-fifth running of the Acropolis Rally. The event was the ninth round of the 2021 World Rally Championship, World Rally Championship-2 and World Rally Championship-3. The 2021 event was based in the town of Lamia in Central Greece and contested over fifteen special stages totalling  in competitive distance.

Jari-Matti Latvala and Miikka Anttila were the reigning rally winners. However, they did not defend their titles as Latvala retired from the competition. Robert Kubica and Maciek Baran were the reigning rally winners in the World Rally Championship-2 category, but they did not defend their titles since Kubica was competing the 2021 Italian Grand Prix.

Kalle Rovanperä and Jonne Halttunen were the overall rally winners. Their team, Toyota Gazoo Racing WRT, were the manufacturer's winners. In the World Rally Championship-2 category, Andreas Mikkelsen won the class with his new co-driver Elliott Edmondson. In the World Rally Championship-3 category, Yohan Rossel and Alexandre Coria finished first in the class. However, they were disqualified from the results after the rally as the front subframe on their Citroën C3 Rally2 was found to be overweight during the post-event scrutineering. The polish crew of Kajetan Kajetanowicz and Maciej Szczepaniak subsequently became the WRC-3 winners.

Background

Championship standings prior to the event
Reigning World Champions Sébastien Ogier and Julien Ingrassia entered the round with a thirty-eight-point lead, with the crew of Elfyn Evans and Scott Martin and of Thierry Neuville and Martijn Wydaeghe shared second. In the World Rally Championship for Manufacturers, Toyota Gazoo Racing WRT held a forty-one--point lead over defending manufacturers' champions Hyundai Shell Mobis WRT, followed by M-Sport Ford WRT.

In the World Rally Championship-2 standings, Andreas Mikkelsen and Ola Fløene held an eleven-point lead ahead of Mads Østberg and Torstein Eriksen in the drivers' and co-drivers' standings respectively, with Marco Bulacia Wilkinson and Marcelo Der Ohannesian in third. In the teams' championship, Toksport WRT led Movisport by thirty-seven points, with M-Sport Ford WRT in third.

In the World Rally Championship-3 standings, Yohan Rossel and Alexandre Coria were the championships leaders, followed by Kajetan Kajetanowicz and Maciek Szczepaniak, with Nicolas Ciamin and Yannick Roche in third.

Entry list
The following crews entered the rally. The event was open to crews competing in the World Rally Championship, its support categories, the World Rally Championship-2 and World Rally Championship-3, and privateer entries that were not registered to score points in any championship. Eleven entries for the World Rally Championship were received, as were ten in the World Rally Championship-2 and nineteen in the World Rally Championship-3.

Route

Itinerary
All dates and times are EET (UTC+3).

Report

World Rally Cars

Classification

Special stages

Championship standings

World Rally Championship-2

Classification

Special stages

Championship standings

World Rally Championship-3

Classification

Special stages

Championship standings

Notes

References

External links

  
 2021 Acropolis Rally at eWRC-results.com
 The official website of the World Rally Championship

Acropolis
Belgium
Acropolis Rally
September 2021 sports events in Greece